LCPA may refer to:

 Latino College Preparatory Academy, a school in San Jose, California
 Lincoln Center for the Performing Arts, a complex of buildings in New York City
 Lincoln College Preparatory Academy, a school in the Kansas City, Missouri